Mahmoud Mirza (9 October 1905 – 2 July 1988), Iranian prince of the Qajar dynasty, was the son of Mohammad Ali Shah Qajar.

He was head of the Qajar dynasty from the death of his nephew Hamid Mirza on 5 May 1988 until his own death on 2 July 1988.

Offspring
He married Effat Ashtiani. They had issue, a daughter and a son:

 Tourandokht (b. 1 February 1940, Deauville) married to Keykhosro Kamrani (d. 8 January 2007, Paris) a descendant of Prince Kamran Mirza son of Naser al-Din Shah. She has two children: Djahangir Kamrani (b. 8 January 1970, Paris) and Navid (15 June 1981, Paris).
 Prince Mohammad Ali Mirza (b. 23 May 1942, Paris). He is a banker. He was first married to Robin Kadjar-Wambold, daughter of Giti Afrouz daughter of Mohammad Hassan Mirza. They divorced without offspring. From his second marriage to Charlotte Fournois, He has one daughter: Roxanne (b. 30 May 1993, Paris)

External links 
 Photo of Mahmoud Mirza
 Qajar pages

Qajar princes
1905 births
1988 deaths
Heads of the Qajar Imperial Family
Qajar pretenders to the Iranian throne
Iranian royalty
Iranian emigrants to France